The following lists events that happened during 2012 in the Republic of Albania.

Incumbents
President:  Bamir Topi (until 24 June), Bujar Nishani (starting 24 June)
Prime Minister: Sali Berisha
Deputy Prime Minister: Edmond Haxhinasto

Events

May
  21 May - occurred Qafa e Vishës bus accident near the town of Himara, causing the death of 13 people and 21 injured, most of them were students.

November
 The remains of former King Zog are repatriated to Albania from France, where he died in 1961.

September 
 21 September - start hunger strike of former politically persecuted in Albania (2012)

Deaths
 26 April - Ardian Klosi, Albanian publicist, albanologist, writer, translator and social activist

References

 
Years of the 21st century in Albania
2010s in Albania